Joseph Walsh (born 1979) is a self-taught Irish furniture maker, artist and designer. He was born in County Cork and founded his gallery, studio and workshop in 1999.

Solo exhibitions
 RINN, Sogetsu Arts Centre, Japan, 2018
 LOCUS, Tsubaki Grand Shrine, Japan, 2017
 REVEAL, American Irish Historical Society  New York, USA, 2017
 LILIUM,  Oliver Sears Gallery, Dublin, Ireland, 2014 
 ENIGNUM and other stories,  Oliver Sears Gallery, Dublin, Ireland, 2011  
 Realisations, American Irish Historical Society , New York, USA, 2008

Selected collections

 National Gallery of Ireland,  Dublin, Ireland
 Tsubaki Grand Shrine, Japan
 Cooper Hewitt, Smithsonian Design Museum, New York, USA 
 Centre Pompidou, Paris, France 
 Museum of Arts and Design, New York, USA
 The Mint Museum of Craft & Design, Charlotte, North Caroline, USA 
 The National Museum of Ireland - Decorative Arts & History, Dublin, Ireland
 Devonshire Collection, Chatsworth House, UK 
 Ulster Museum, Ireland 
 Embassy of Japan, Dublin, Ireland 
 Private collection, Mumbai, India

Critical reception
Ayesha Sohail Shehmir Shaikh, "Design Miami/Basel 2019: Highlights From The Collectible Design Fair", June 11, 2019 
"Elemental Design", Aesthetica, 23 May 2019 
Mozez Singh, "This incredible cottage perched on Mumbai’s Juhu Beach speaks volumes with its design", Architectural Digest, January 14, 2019 
Mitchell Owens, "HOT SEATS", Architectural Digest, March 2018 
Mitchell Owens, "Joseph Walsh Gives Derbyshire Palace A Modern Update", Architecture + Design, February 27, 2018 
Raul Barrenche, "The Magical World of Joseph Walsh’s Wood Furnishings", Galerie, Winter 2017  Mirror Mirror: Reflections on Design at Chatsworth House, 2023

References

 Flegg, Eleanor, Frances McDonald, and Luke Butler. “Design: Portfolio.” Irish Arts Review (2002-) 35, no. 4 (2018): 62–70. Design: Portfolio.
 McBrinn, Joseph. “A Quiet Renaissance: Contemporary Irish Craft and Design.” Irish Arts Review (2002-) 26, no. 2 (2009): 112–15. A quiet renaissance: contemporary Irish craft and design.
"Joseph Walsh Studio- Limited Edition", (Ireland; Cork, Joseph Walsh Studio, 2020)

External links

   The Dommus Collection by Joseph Walsh Studio features limited edition furniture pieces. 20 January 2018. Retrieved 14 February 2022

Living people
1979 births
Irish designers
Furniture makers
People from County Cork